VICAR is an image file format developed by the NASA's Jet Propulsion Laboratory. It has been used to transport images from a variety of space missions including Cassini–Huygens and the Viking Orbiter.

References

External links 
Collection of images from the Cassini orbiter
VICAR2PNG a tool that converts VICAR images.

Jet Propulsion Laboratory
Computer file formats